Andrew Gormley was the drummer for the band Rorschach (band), a hardcore band from New Jersey.

Bands 
 Torment (thrash metal) - drums (1988)
 Under Control (hardcore punk) - drums (1988)
 Rorschach (band) (hardcore punk) - drums (1989–1993, reunion 2009)
 Die 116 (post hardcore) - drums (1993–1995)
 Kiss it Goodbye (hardcore metal)  - drums (1995–1998)
 Today is the Day (metal) - drums (fill in, two shows 1998)
 Shai Hulud - drums (1998, 2004–2007)
 Playing Enemy (prog metal hardcore) - drums (1999–2007)
 Spacebag (math/grind) Drums 2011–Present

External links
Gern Blandsten Records - Charles Maggio's record label, including a short biography of Rorschach
Rorschach - BandToBand.com 
Another site on Rorschach

References 

American punk rock drummers
American male drummers
American drummers
Musicians from New Jersey
Year of birth missing (living people)
Living people
Place of birth missing (living people)
Shai Hulud members